The long-nosed caenolestid (Rhyncholestes raphanurus), also known as the Chilean shrew opossum or long-nosed shrew opossum, is a shrew opossum that occurs in temperate forests of Argentina and southern Chile. It was first described by American zoologist Wilfred Hudson Osgood in 1924. The long-nosed caenolestid resembles Caenolestes species in morphology. It is characterized by a long, pointed snout, small eyes and ears, and one claw on a digit of each of the thin limbs. Little is known of its behavior; it appears to be terrestrial (lives on land), nocturnal (active mainly at night) and omnivorous. It prefers cool, moist areas, and has a small distribution. It is classified as near threatened by the IUCN.

Taxonomy and etymology 
The long-nosed caenolestid is the sole member of its genus, and is classified in the family Caenolestidae. It was first described by American zoologist Wilfred Hudson Osgood in 1924. Two subspecies are recognised:
R. r. continentalis Bublitz, 1987: Occurs in Argentina and Chile (type locality: Cerro la Picada).
R. r. raphanurus Osgood, 1924: Occurs in southern Chiloé Island (off the coast of Chile).

A 2013 morphological and mitochondrial DNA-based phylogenetic study showed that the Incan caenolestid (Lestoros inca) and the long-nosed caenolestid form a clade sister to Caenolestes. The cladogram below is based on this study.

Caenolestid fossils date to as early as the early Eocene (nearly 55 mya). The generic name derives from the Greek words rhynchos ("snout") and lestes ("robber", "pirate"). The specific name comes from the Greek raphanos ("cabbage"), referring to the thick tail of this caenolestid. The Spanish name for this caenolestid, comadrejita trompuda, is the combination of comadreja ("weasel") and trompa ("snout"). Other names for this shrew opossum are Chilean shrew opossum or Chilean caenolestid.

Description 
The long-nosed caenolestid resembles Caenolestes species in morphology. In his 1924 account, Osgood recorded external measurements of three specimens. The smooth coat is dark greyish brown, without countershading (greater pigmentation on the upper side). It is characterized by a long, pointed snout, small eyes and ears, and one claw on a digit of each of the thin limbs. This shrew opossum lacks a marsupium (young are attached to the nipples) and has seven nipples, unlike the four typical of other caenolestids. The tail helps in balancing the body during locomotion; the relatively shorter tail could imply lesser agility in the long-nosed caenolestid in comparison to other caenolestids. Moreover, the tail can be used to store fat, and is reportedly thickest during early winter.
 
A 2007 study recorded dental anomalies such as missing teeth and supernumerary teeth. The rodent-like incisors help in killing vertebrate prey and searching for insects in crevices. The pattern of tooth eruption appears to be largely consistent in all caenolestids – the eruption of procumbent (trailing along the surface without spreading out roots) incisors, followed by the development of closely spaced incisors that distance from one another as the mandible grows, and then the eruption of molars and premolars.

Ecology and behavior 
Little is known of the behavior of the long-nosed caenolestid. It appears to be terrestrial (lives on land) and nocturnal (active mainly at night). An omnivore, it feeds on insects and small invertebrates as well as plant material such as fungi. The caenolestid appears to live in burrows and fallen logs; nests may be used temporarily. Lactating females have been reported in May as well as from October to March.

Distribution and status
It prefers cool, moist areas. Known from less than 25 locations, it has a very small distribution. This shrew opossum also marks the southern limit of the distribution of caenolestids. Though locally abundant, the survival of the caenolestid is threatened by deforestation. Its population has declined by nearly 20% since the 1990s due to deforestation and human settlement. The IUCN classifies the long-nosed caenolestid as near threatened.

References

External links

Rhyncholestes raphanurus image

Shrew opossums
Marsupials of Argentina
Marsupials of Chile
Near threatened animals
Near threatened biota of South America
Mammals described in 1924
Fauna of the Valdivian temperate rainforest